The Schleiden Medal is an award given by the Academy of Sciences Leopoldina, the National Academy of Germany, to honour outstanding achievements in the field of cellular biology. The award is named after botanist Matthias Jakob Schleiden.

Recipients

 1955 : Emil Heitz
 1958 : Albert Frey-Wyssling
 1961 : Jean Brachet (co-recipient)
 1973 : Irene Manton & Torbjörn Caspersson
 1975 : Wilhelm Bernhard
 1977 : Ernst Wohlfarth-Bottermann
 1980 : Karl Lennert
 1983 : Berta Scharrer
 1985 : George Emil Palade
 1987 : Zdeněk Lojda
 1989 : A. G. Everson Pearse
 1991 : Peter Sitte
 1993 : Gottfried Schatz
 1995 : Philipp U. Heitz
 1998 : Avram Hershko
 1999 : Walter Neupert
 2001 : Kai Simons
 2003 : Ari Helenius
 2005 : Wolfgang Baumeister
 2007 : Alexander Varshavsky
 2009 : Thomas Cremer
 2011 : Tom Rapoport
 2013 : Ingrid Grummt
 2015 : Johannes Buchner
 2017 : Anthony A. Hyman
 2019 : Elena Conti
 2021 : Nikolaus Pfanner

See also

 List of biology awards

References

Biology awards
Awards established in 1955
1955 establishments in Germany
German Academy of Sciences Leopoldina
German science and technology awards
Scientific research awards